Sergei Makarov (born June 19, 1964) is a Russian former professional ice hockey defenceman.

Makarov played eight seasons playing with Krylya Sovetov Moscow in the Soviet Championship League.

References
 

1964 births
Living people
Detroit Falcons (CoHL) players
HC Khimik Voskresensk players
Krylya Sovetov Moscow players
Lukko players
Molot-Prikamye Perm players
Russian ice hockey defencemen
Torpedo Nizhny Novgorod players